Dimitri Zaitz (November 7, 1917 – January 26, 1996) was an American athlete. He competed in the men's shot put at the 1936 Summer Olympics.

References

External links

1917 births
1996 deaths
Athletes (track and field) at the 1936 Summer Olympics
American male shot putters
Olympic track and field athletes of the United States
Place of birth missing